Nandipet is a village and mandal in Nizamabad District in the state of Telangana in India. 
Nandipet is around 25 km from Nizamabad. Palugugutta (Navasiddula Gutta) is a famous place in Nandipet mandal. There are 28 village panchayats in this mandal. Some of the villages, such as Donkeshwer, Nikalpoor,  Annaram and Vannel K, are bordered by the river Godavari, which flows within Maharashtra and Telangana states. Donkeshwer is developed village in nandipet mandal. when floods came in Maharastra, Donkeswar village is drowned in godavari. There are lot of people from donkeshwar in different domains like cinema industry and in business. Turmeric is grown there.

References 

Villages in Nizamabad district
Mandals in Nizamabad district